The Wildseeloderhaus is an Alpine hut owned by the Austrian Alpine Club (OeAV) that lies below the Wildseeloder mountain in the  Kitzbühel Alps in Austria.

Location 
The hut lies at a height of 1,854 metres in a cirque hollow by a small mountain lake between the summits of Henne and Wildseeloder above the village of Fieberbrunn in the Pillerseetal valley. It is a base for numerous mountain hikes in the eastern Kitzbühel Alps. The house lies opposite the Loferer Steinberge range and overlooks its southern rock faces.

History 
The Wildseeloderhaus was built in 1891/1892 as a joint project by the Fieberbrunn Section of the OeAV and the Fieberbrunn Tourist Association. Since 1899 the Alpine Club has been the sole owner of the hut. In 1963, the ruined chapel was rebuilt and, in 1970, the hut itself was modified and extended. A further modification was carried out in 2008.

Facilities 
The hut has two double bedrooms, two four-bed rooms, a 12-man mattress room and a 16-man mattress room.

Access 
The Wildseeloder is the local mountain (Hausberg) of the town of Fieberbrunn which may be accessed:
by train: with the ÖBB to Fieberbrunn
by bus: between the villages in the Pillerseetal and Fieberbrunn.
by car: to the car park by the Fieberbrunn Cable Car.

Approaches 
The normal approaches to the hut are:
 from Fieberbrunn in 3½-4 hours via Alpine Club Way (AV-Weg) No. 711
 from the valley station of the Fieberbrunn Cable Car (3 hours)
 by cable car to the Lärchfilzkogel (1,650 m) and an hour’s walk from the cable car station.
 from the Gasthaus Lärchfilzhochalm in 1 hour, 45 minutes.
 from Hörndlingergraben / Gasthaus Pulvermacher Scherm (3½-4 hours)

Hiking routes 
The alpine hut has routes to the following nearby mountains:
 to the local Wildseeloder mountain (2,119 m), duration: 1 hour
 to the Henne (2,074 m), duration: 30 minutes
 Klettersteig to the Henne from the Hochhörndler Spitze top station, duration: 1 hour
 to the Mahdstein (2,063 m), duration: 2 hours
 to the Bischof (2,127 m), duration: 3 hours
 to the Gebra (2,054 m), duration: 3½ hours
 on the mountain trail (Höhenweg) to the Kitzbüheler Horn, duration: 8 hours
 Fieberbrunner Mountain Trail (Höhenweg), duration: 5 hours

Crossings 
 via the Hochwildalm Hut to the Bochumer Hut, 1,432 m, duration: 7–8 hours
 via the Alpine Club Way (AV-Weg) 711 to the Hochwildalm Hut, 1,557 m, duration: 3–4 hours.
 via the Blumenweg trail to the Hochhörndl Hut, 1,809 m, duration: 1 hour

References

External links 
 Fieberbrunn Section in the OeAV 
 Wildseeloderhaus home page.

Mountain huts in Austria
Kitzbühel Alps